Priskila Siahaya (born 7 December 1996) is an Indonesian badminton player. She is now representing Germany in the international tournaments.

Achievements

BWF International Challenge/Series 
Women's singles

  BWF International Challenge tournament
  BWF International Series tournament
  BWF Future Series tournament

References

External links 
 

1996 births
Living people
Sportspeople from West Java
Indonesian female badminton players
German female badminton players
21st-century Indonesian women
20th-century Indonesian women